Elbow is an unincorporated community in Madison Township, Richland County, Illinois, United States.

References

Unincorporated communities in Richland County, Illinois
Unincorporated communities in Illinois